A Mini-Ring is a peal of small bells hung for change-ringing. They are used for training, demonstrational, and leisure purposes.

Although normally hung in secular or private settings, several mini-rings are hung in churches.

References

Bells (percussion)
Campanology